Revelation is the fifth studio album by the American heavy metal band Armored Saint. It was released in 2000 on Metal Blade Records. Armored Saint reformed in the entire Symbol of Salvation lineup to record Revelation in 1999 after six years of being disbanded. The result is a traditional heavy metal record and a natural sequel of their previous effort. The limited edition came with a bonus CD including the complete A Trip Thru Red Times video.

"Creepy Feelings", "What's Your Pleasure", and the Japanese bonus track "Shadows" were originally demoed in 1989 with original guitarist Dave Prichard during the writing sessions of what would become the Symbol of Salvation album, but ultimately did not make the cut.

The song "The Pillar" was originally written for the 1992 horror film Hellraiser III: Hell on Earth where the band makes a cameo appearance as a bar band performing the song "Hanging Judge" at the 'Boiler Room' club.

Track listing

Bonus tracks (Japanese version)

Personnel
Band members
John Bush – vocals
Phil Sandoval – lead guitar
Jeff Duncan – rhythm guitar, lead guitar
Joey Vera –  bass, percussion, sequencing
Gonzo Sandoval – drums, percussion

Additional musician
Jon Saxon – percussion

Production
Joey Vera – production, engineering
Bill Metoyer – mixing
Brad Winslow – assistant mixing
Matt Quave – assistant mixing
Mitch Rellas – engineering
Eddy Schreyer – mastering
Brian Slagel – executive production
Wayne Douglas Barlowe – cover art
Alex Solca – photography

References

External links 
Official band website
[ Armored Saint on AllMusic Guide]
Armored Saint's Revelation on Encyclopaedia Metallum

2000 albums
Metal Blade Records albums
Armored Saint albums